Biancucci is an Italian surname. Notable people with the surname include:

Paolo Biancucci (1583–1653), Italian Baroque painter
Robert Biancucci, Australian Paralympic athlete
Maxi Biancucchi (born 1984), Argentine footballer
Vincent A. Biancucci (1940-2018), American politician

Italian-language surnames